Mucilaginibacter composti is a Gram-negative, strictly aerobic rod-shaped, non-spore-forming and non-motile bacterium from the genus of Mucilaginibacter which has been isolated from compost.

References

Sphingobacteriia
Bacteria described in 2011